The Waya  Stakes is a Grade III American Thoroughbred horse race  for fillies and mares, three years old and older run over a distance of  miles on the turf held annually in October at Belmont Park in Elmont, New York. The event offers a purse of $200,000.

History 
The race was inaugurated on 24 August 1992 and was run over the distance  miles on the Inner Turf track at Saratoga Race Course in Saratoga Springs, New York.

The event is named in honor of the French-bred multiple graded stakes-winning mare Waya 
who received the 1979 Eclipse Award as the American Champion Older Female Horse. Waya won the 1978 rendition of the Grade II Diana Handicap at Saratoga.

In 1996 and 1997 the event was moved to the main turf track and run at a longer distance of  miles.

The event was idle for 5 years from 1998 to 2002 and when it resumed in 2003 it had lost its Listed classification. The renewal was also taken off the Inner Turf track and run on the sloppy dirt track. The event was not held in 2008 and run on the dirt in 2004, 2007, and 2018.

In 2015 the event was upgraded to Grade III but since the event was taken off the turf in 2018 it only was a Listed type event.

In 2021 the event was moved to Belmont Park and the distance was shortened to  miles.

In 2022 the event was moved to Aqueduct Racetrack due to infield tunnel and redevelopment work at Belmont Park.

Records
Speed record: 
  miles Inner Turf – 2:25.96 –  Guapaza (CHI)   (2016)
  miles Main Turf – 2:40.19 –  Ampulla (1996)
  miles Inner Turf – 2:13.35 – Fairy Garden (1992)

Margins: 
 12 lengths – Born Twice  (1997) 

Most wins
 2 – Saratoga Source  (1993, 1994)
 2 – My Sister Nat (FR) (2020, 2021)

Most wins by a jockey  
 3 – Javier Castellano   (2016, 2017, 2019)

Most wins by a trainer
 6 – Chad C. Brown (2015, 2016, 2019, 2020, 2021, 2022)

Most wins by an owner
 5 – Augustin Stable (1993, 1994, 2004, 2005, 2011)

Winners 

Legend:

See also
List of American and Canadian Graded races

References 

Graded stakes races in the United States
Grade 3 stakes races in the United States
1992 establishments in New York (state)
Horse races in New York (state)
Turf races in the United States
Recurring sporting events established in 1992
Saratoga Race Course
Long-distance horse races for fillies and mares